Ambalamedu is a small township located in Kerala, India. Ambalamedu is located near the border of the former states of Travancore and Cochin and lies on a lake.

History 
Ambalamedu is now associated with the Cochin Division of the Fertilisers and Chemicals Travancore Ltd. (FACT), a public enterprise. FACT, then under its illustrious chairman and managing director, M.K.K. Nair, acquired about 1500 acres (6 km²) of land in the mid-1960s for the construction of an ammonia and urea manufacturing plants. Construction of the factory and the township commenced in 1966 under the able supervision of Chief Engineer Ranganathan. The native population that held agricultural land in the area were rehabilitated outside the township.

To meet the high demand of water in manufacturing fertilizer, over 250 acres (1 km²) of paddy fields were converted into a lake by constructing an earthen dam and water brought in through a canal from Bhoothathankettu dam, near Kothamangalam. At the centre of the lake is an island on which the Ambalamedu House is situated. An exquisite building complex that blends modern architecture with the traditional Kerala style, it served as the division's main guest house.

Along the shores of the lake are houses built incorporating many elements of Kerala's unique architecture. Most of the houses overlook the lake with no buildings to obstruct the view. The township is thus a very rare example of a planned industrial township that is designed in the most aesthetic manner accentuating the beauty and ambience of nature surrounding it. With conserving many trees and rare plants, the township is built beautifully in a lush greenery with all major facilities including, schools, parks, stores and hospital, which makes it one of its kind. Ambalamedu flourished from the 1960s through the 1990s. It was truly a tranquil paradise that so marvellously masked the grime and smoke of the industrial complex surrounding it.

Unfortunately, with the public sector company in financial trouble due to the liberalization of the markets and consequent loss of government subsidies for fertilizer manufacture while under a regulated price regime, Ambalamedu township fell into bad times. Wanton pollution from the nearby factories such as Carbon Black near Karimugal turned it into an undesirable place to live. FACT employees slowly abandoned the township and today many of the houses remain empty and in a very poor state of repair.

Landmarks 

 Ambalamedu High School

Temples 
Harimattom temple is the famous in ambalamedu. "Shankara Narayana" sangamam is the speciality of this temple. "Harimattom Pooram" is the famous celebration in here. Various cultural and traditional activities can arranged in here. "Ambalamedu kalakshettra" is the one of the part of this temple. It should have a traditional background.various famous persons presented various traditional programs. "Ambalamedu Kalakshettra" is the heart beat of ambalamedu.

Location 
Ambalamedu is around 8 kilometers from Tripunithura on the way from Thripunithura to Aluva via Karimugal. The distance from Aluva to Ambalamedu is 20 kilometers.

References 

Cities and towns in Ernakulam district